Ioannis Kalogeropoulos (born 11 January 1994) is a Greek track cyclist, who competes in sprinting events.

References

External links

1994 births
Living people
Greek track cyclists
Greek male cyclists
21st-century Greek people